Egusi (Yoruba: ẹ̀gúsí, Igbo: ègwusi), also known as, agusi, ohue, Ikpan, Ikon, or agushi)  is the name for the protein-rich seeds of certain cucurbitaceous plants (squash, melon, gourd), which, after being dried and ground, are used as a major ingredient in West African cuisine.

Authorities disagree whether the word is used more properly for the seeds of the colocynth, those of a particular large-seeded variety of the watermelon, or generically for those of any cucurbitaceous plant.  Egusi seeds are in a class of their own and should never be mistaken for pumpkin or watermelon seeds. In particular the name "egusi" may refer to either or both plants (or more generically to other cucurbits) in their capacity as seed crops, or to a soup made from these seeds and popular in West Africa.

The characteristics and uses of all these seeds are broadly similar. Major egusi-growing nations include Nigeria, Burkina Faso, Togo, Ghana, Côte d'Ivoire, Benin, Mali, and Cameroon.

Species from which egusi is derived include Cucumeropsis mannii and Citrullus lanatus.

Usage
Egusi soup is a soup thickened with the seeds. Egusi soup is popular in West Africa, with considerable local variations.  Besides the seeds, water, and oil, egusi soup typically contains leaf vegetables, palm oil, other vegetables, seasonings, and meat,. Leaf vegetables typically used for egusi soup include bitterleaf, pumpkin leaf, celosia and spinach.  Typical other vegetables include tomatoes and okra.  Typical seasonings include chili peppers, onions, and locust beans. Also commonly used are beef, goat, fish, shrimp, or crayfish.

In Nigeria, egusi is common among the people of the southern and western part of Nigeria.

In Ghana, egusi is also called akatoa or agushi, and is used for soup and stew, most popularly in palaver sauce.

In the late 1980s, the Government of Canada funded a project intended to develop a machine to help Cameroonians shell egusi seeds. A machine has also been developed in Nigeria to shell egusi.

Gallery

See also
 Egusi sauce
 Igbo cuisine
 List of African dishes
 List of melon dishes and foods
 List of stews
 Pumpkin seeds
 Watermelon seed oil

References

African soups
Edible nuts and seeds
Igbo cuisine
Melon production
Nigerian cuisine
Yoruba cuisine